Maricourt may refer to:

People
André de Maricourt (1874-1945), French writer
Pierre de Maricourt, scholar of the Middle Ages XIIIth century

Places names
Maricourt, Quebec, Canada
Maricourt Lake, in Abitibi-Témiscamingue, Quebec, Canada
Maricourt, Somme, France